In complex analysis, a branch of mathematics, the Koebe 1/4 theorem states the following:

Koebe Quarter Theorem. The image of an injective analytic function  from the unit disk 

The theorem is named after Paul Koebe, who conjectured the result in 1907. The theorem was proven by Ludwig Bieberbach in 1916. The example of the Koebe function shows that the constant  in the theorem cannot be improved (increased).

A related result is the Schwarz lemma, and a notion related to both is conformal radius.

Grönwall's area theorem

Suppose that 

Then

In fact, if , the complement of the image of the disk  is a bounded domain . Its area is given by

The above proof shows equality holds if and only if the complement of the image of  has zero area, i.e. Lebesgue measure zero.

This result was proved in 1914 by the Swedish mathematician Thomas Hakon Grönwall.

Koebe function
The Koebe function is defined by 

Application of the theorem to this function shows that the constant  in the theorem cannot be improved, as the image domain 

The rotated Koebe function is 

with  a complex number of absolute value .

Bieberbach's coefficient inequality for univalent functions
Let

Then

This follows by applying Gronwall's area theorem to the odd univalent function 

Equality holds if and only if  is a rotated Koebe function.

This result was proved by Ludwig Bieberbach in 1916 and provided the basis for his celebrated conjecture that 
, proved in 1985 by Louis de Branges.

Proof of quarter theorem
Applying an affine map, it can be assumed that 

so that 

so that

Koebe distortion theorem
The Koebe distortion theorem gives a series of bounds for a univalent function and its derivative. It is a direct consequence of Bieberbach's inequality for the second coefficient and the Koebe quarter theorem. 

Then

with equality if and only if  is a Koebe function

Notes

References

External links
 Koebe 1/4 theorem at PlanetMath

Theorems in complex analysis